Elections were held in the Australian state of Queensland on 8 May 1926 to elect the 72 members of the state's Legislative Assembly. The Labor government was seeking its fifth continuous term in office since the 1915 election. William McCormack was contesting his first election as Premier.

During the previous term,  the Country and United parties had merged into the Country and Progressive National Party.

Key dates

Results

|}

 484,212 electors were enrolled to vote at the election, but 5 Labor seats and one CPNP seat were filled without opposition.
 The CPNP result is compared to the combined result for the Queensland United Party and the Country Party in the preceding election.

Seats changing party representation

This table lists changes in party representation at the 1926 election.

See also
 Members of the Queensland Legislative Assembly, 1923–1926
 Members of the Queensland Legislative Assembly, 1926–1929
 Candidates of the Queensland state election, 1926
 Theodore Ministry

References

Elections in Queensland
1926 elections in Australia
1920s in Queensland
May 1926 events